Zewe is a surname. Notable people with the surname include:

Charles Zewe, American reporter
Gerd Zewe (born 1950), German footballer and manager
Joe Zewe (born 1983), American soccer player